Paul Norton MacEachron (November 28, 1889 – June 1, 1930) was an American college football and college basketball coach. He served as the head football coach at Oberlin College from 1925 to 1929, compiling a record of 28–9–3. He was also the head basketball coach at Oberlin from 1925 to 1930, tallying a mark of 21–45.  MacEachron died of a heart attack on June 1, 1930, at Chance Creek, in Oberlin, Ohio.

Head coaching record

Football

References

External links
 

1889 births
1930 deaths
American men's basketball players
Basketball coaches from Nebraska
Basketball players from Nebraska
Grinnell Pioneers football coaches
Grinnell Pioneers football players
Grinnell Pioneers men's basketball coaches
Grinnell Pioneers men's basketball players
Oberlin Yeomen basketball coaches
Oberlin Yeomen football coaches
People from Franklin County, Nebraska